Sailen Manna Stadium (also known as Howrah Municipal Corporation Stadium) is a multi-use stadium in Howrah, West Bengal, India. It is mainly used for football matches and hosted some matches during the AFC Youth Championship 2006. The capacity of the stadium is 15,000 people. Howrah Rugby Crows and several football clubs use the venue for home games.

References

External links
Stadium picture

Buildings and structures in Howrah
Football venues in West Bengal
Sports in Howrah
Sports venues in West Bengal
Year of establishment missing